Hayri Polat (born 4 April 1948) is a Turkish former wrestler who competed in the 1972 Summer Olympics.

References

External links
 

1948 births
Living people
Olympic wrestlers of Turkey
Wrestlers at the 1972 Summer Olympics
Turkish male sport wrestlers
20th-century Turkish people